Sam Pearson may refer to:
 Sam Pearson (Emmerdale)
 Sam Pearson (footballer)

See also
 Samuel Pearson, English entrepreneur and founder of Pearson plc